This is a partial list of Jupiter's  trojans (60° ahead of Jupiter) with numbers 1–100000 .

1–100000 

This list contains 561 objects sorted in numerical order.

top

References 
 

 Greek_0
Jupiter Trojans (Trojan Camp)
Lists of Jupiter trojans